HR3D is a multiscopic 3D display technology developed at the MIT Media Lab.

Technology

The technology uses double-layered LCD panels.

Mathematics

"HR" stands for "high-rank", and refers to algebraic rank; the related paper describes how light fields can be represented with low rank.

External links
 http://web.media.mit.edu/~mhirsch/hr3d/
 https://web.archive.org/web/20110814193452/http://cameraculture.media.mit.edu/hr3d/faq.html

3D imaging